Madison Township is an inactive township in Johnson County, in the U.S. state of Missouri.

Madison Township was established in 1835, taking its name from President James Madison.

References

Townships in Missouri
Townships in Johnson County, Missouri